The Clash: Westway to the World is a 2000 documentary film about the British punk rock band The Clash. In 2003 it won the Grammy Award for Best Long Form Music Video.

Directed by Don Letts, the film combines old footage from the band's personal collection filmed in 1982 when The Clash went to New York City with new interviews conducted for the film by Mal Peachey of members Mick Jones, Paul Simonon, Topper Headon, and Joe Strummer and other people associated with the group (including founding drummer Terry Chimes).
The Clash: Westway to the World provides an overview of the band's history, and implies that The Clash broke up in 1983 when Mick Jones left, making no mention of the post-Jones version of The Clash which existed between 1983 and 1986, nor the album that iteration produced (Cut the Crap). The band make the point in Westway that creatively and spiritually Jones' leaving marked the end of The Clash. Strummer apologises on screen for sacking Jones and admits that it was a mistake. An unofficial documentary titled The Rise and Fall of The Clash covers the post-Jones period through interviews with latter-day Clash members Pete Howard, Nick Sheppard, and Vince White.

Appearing
 Terry Chimes
 Terence Dackombe
 Topper Headon
 Mick Jones
 Jordan
 Paul Simonon
 Siouxsie Sioux
 Joe Strummer
 Shane MacGowan
 Dave Vanian

References

External links

2000 films
Documentary films about punk music and musicians
The Clash
Grammy Award for Best Long Form Music Video
Films directed by Don Letts
2000s English-language films